The 2020–21 season is Pallacanestro Trieste's 47th in existence and the club's 4th consecutive season in the top tier Italian basketball.

Kit 
Supplier: Adidas / Sponsor: Allianz

Players

Current roster

Depth chart

Squad changes

In 

|}

Out 

|}

Confirmed 

|}

Coach

On loan

Competitions

Supercup

Serie A

References 

2021–22 in Italian basketball by club